The Internationales Archiv für Sozialgeschichte der deutschen Literatur (IASL) is an academic journal devoted to German literature studies, medieval through contemporary. Founded in 1976, it focuses on the relationship between literature and social history and on intersections of literary theory, history, and the social sciences. Articles are published in German and English.

References

Journal homepage (in German)

1976 establishments in West Germany
Literary magazines published in Germany
Publications established in 1976
German-language journals